Cephalanthera falcata, the golden orchid, is a species of orchid. It is native to Japan, Korea, and China (Anhui, Fujian, Guangdong, Guangxi, Guizhou, Hubei, Hunan, Jiangsu, Jiangxi, Sichuan, Yunnan).

References

External links

falcata
Orchids of China
Orchids of Japan
Orchids of Korea
Plants described in 1784